Cyphomenes infernalis is a species of insect in the genus Cyphomenes and the family Eumenidae native to Mexico, Guatemala, Venezuela, and Peru first described by Henri Louis Frédéric de Saussure in 1875. As of 2017 there is one subspecies listed in the Catalogue of Life, Cyphomenes infernalis weyrauchi.

References

Hymenoptera of South America
Potter wasps
Insects described in 1875